Far and Away is a 1992 American epic Western romantic adventure drama film directed by Ron Howard from a screenplay by Bob Dolman and a story by Howard and Dolman. It stars Tom Cruise and Nicole Kidman. This was the last cinematography credit for Mikael Salomon before he moved on to a directing career, and the music score was by John Williams. It was screened out of competition at the 1992 Cannes Film Festival.

Cruise and Kidman play Irish immigrants seeking their fortune in 1890s America, eventually taking part in the Land Run of 1893.

This was Cyril Cusack's final film before his death the following year.

Plot
In Ireland in 1892, Joseph Donnelly's family home is burned down by his landlord Daniel Christie's men because of unpaid rent. Joseph tries killing Daniel, but he injures himself in the process and is nursed back to health by Nora, Daniel's wife, and her daughter, Shannon. Shannon plans to run away from home and travel to America, as there is land being given away for free there, taking Joseph with her as her servant.

Together on a ship bound for America, Shannon meets Mr. McGuire, who tells her and Joseph about free land being given away in Oklahoma. Shannon divulges that her collection of silver spoons will cover all expenses to get them to Oklahoma, and McGuire offers to help her find a shop to sell them to once they arrive. Upon arriving, McGuire is shot, and Shannon loses her spoons. Mike Kelly, a Boston ward boss, finds Joseph and Shannon jobs and a room to rent. Joseph becomes a regular in bare-knuckle boxing matches at Boss Kelly's club to make extra cash.

Joseph discovers that Shannon has gone to Kelly's club to dance burlesque. The Irish men surrounding the couple beg him to fight for $200, which would get them to Oklahoma. Joseph agrees and is winning until he notices one of his backers groping Shannon. Joseph pushes through the crowd to free her, but is pushed back into the ring where he is defeated by a sucker punch. Joseph returns to their room to find Kelly and his thugs taking the money he and Shannon saved, and Joseph and Shannon are thrown out into the streets, homeless.

Cold and famished, the pair stay in a seemingly abandoned house. The owners of the house return and chase them away, shooting Shannon in the back. Joseph, knowing the Christies are looking for her in Boston, brings Shannon to the home where they're staying. Deciding Shannon will be better cared for by them, Joseph leaves, despite his obvious feelings for her. Joseph heads west to the Ozarks, and finds work laying train track. He sees a wagon train out the door of his boxcar. Knowing it is headed for the Oklahoma land rush, Joseph abandons the railroad and joins the wagon train, arriving in time for the Land Run of 1893.

Joseph finds Shannon, Chase, and the Christies already in Oklahoma. Chase, having seen Joseph talking to Shannon, threatens to kill him if he goes near Shannon again. Joseph outpaces everybody and catches up with Shannon and Chase.  Joseph is ready to plant his claim flag, but Chase rushes on horseback at Joseph. A fight breaks out, with Joseph being crushed by the horse. Shannon runs to his side and rejects Chase when he questions her actions. Joseph professes his love for Shannon and dies in her arms, but comes back to life fully revived when Shannon reciprocates Joseph's love. They both drive the land stake into the ground and claim their prize land together.

Cast

Production
The film was shot in Montana for business reasons, but the Oklahoma Historical Society was involved in its production. Imagine Production Co. toured the areas around Montana for a week. They visited different areas before selecting Billings, Montana.  Ron Howard, whose film Backdraft was in the stages of being released in theatres at the time, arrived in Billings to begin groundwork for the film. One site outside of town was a  ranch, which was going to be used to film the Oklahoma Land Rush scene. Working titles for the film included The Irish Story and An Irish Story.

Principal photography began in Montana on May 28, 1991. After several weeks of preparation, the cast and crew filmed the Oklahoma Land Rush scene on July 7, 1991. Eight hundred riders and extras, nine hundred horses, mule, oxen, and two hundred wagons were used on a quarter mile wide set. Nine cameras were used to film the action sequences. During the filming of the scene four people broke bones and one horse died.  Cruise's boxing match was filmed at the Billings Depot. Local area residents were used as extras for the sequence. American Humane reported that "The production company not only met American Humane's Guidelines, but went that extra mile to ensure both the physical and mental well-being of the animals."
After filming wrapped in Billings, the cast and crew traveled to Dublin, Ireland, to complete filming. Ardmore Studios in Wicklow was used to film interior sequences, and the streets of Boston were filmed in Dublin city.

It was the first film shot in Panavision Super 70 and the first film to be shot in 70mm in a decade since Tron (1982). The Arriflex 765 camera was also used, as the camera was capable of 100 frames per second which was used for slow-motion shots during the Oklahoma land rush scene.

Soundtrack

The music to Far and Away was composed and conducted by John Williams. The score, a mixture of traditional Irish instrumentation and conventional orchestra, prominently featured performances by the Irish musical group The Chieftains and a revision of the song "Book of Days" composed and performed by Enya.  The soundtrack was released 26 May 1992 through MCA Records and features 19 tracks of music at a running time just over 67 minutes. Selections from the soundtrack have been featured in the trailers for various films including Rudy (1993), Getting Even with Dad (1994), Circle of Friends (1995), Treasure Planet (2002) and Charlotte's Web (2006).

 "County Galway, June 1892" (1:55)
 "The Fighting Donellys" (2:18) – featured performance by The Chieftains
 "Joe Sr.'s Passing/The Duel Scene" (4:41)
 "Leaving Home" (1:55)
 "Burning the Manor House" (2:43)
 "Blowing Off Steam" (1:31)
 "Fighting for Dough" (2:02) – featured performance by The Chieftains
 "Am I Beautiful?" (3:38)
 "The Big Match" (5:56)
 "Inside the Mansion" (4:24)
 "Shannon is Shot" (4:06)
 "Joseph's Dream" (3:08)
 "The Reunion" (3:50)
 "Oklahoma Territory" (2:12)
 "The Land Race" (4:56)
 "Settling with Steven/The Race to the River" (4:08)
 "Joseph and Shannon" (3:14)
 "Book of Days" (2:53) – composed and performed by Enya
 "End Credits" (6:35) – featured performance by The Chieftains

La-La Land Records released a remastered 2-CD set in March 2020 as a limited edition of 3500. This release includes alternate cues as well as previously unreleased score components.

 County Galway, June 1892 2:01
 The Fighting Donnellys+ 2:22
 Joe Sr.'s Passing** 2:22
 The Village Burns* 1:56
 Leaving Home 2:02
 The Barn/Running Away* 4:32
 The Duel Scene+ 3:02
 This is My Destiny* 1:12
 Burning the Manor House 2:50
 Am I Beautiful? 3:43
 Blowing Off Steam 1:36
 Fighting for Dough +2:07
 My Own Man* 1:15
 Into the Bath* 1:37
 The Big Match 6:02
 Banished* 3:40
 Inside the Mansion 4:30
 Shannon is Shot 4:13
 Day Dreaming 1:13
 Joseph's Dream 3:13
 The Horseshoe* :35
 The Reunion (Film Version) 2:57

Score Presentation (cont'd)
 Oklahoma Territory 2:17
 The Land Race 5:03
 Race to the River 1:51
 Settling with Stephen** 3:09
 Joseph and Shannon 3:22
 End Credits+ 6:43
Total Score Presentation: 1:21:53
Additional music 28:28
 Joe Sr.'s Passing (Alternate)** 1:37
 The Barn (Alternate)* 2:41
 My Own Man (Alternate)* 1:14
 The Big Match (Alternate)** 5:24
 Oklahoma Territory (Film Version)** 2:17
 The Land Race (Alternate)** 5:01
 Joseph and Shannon (Alternate)** 3:21
 End Credits (Alternate)**+ 6:47
Total (2-disc) Time: 1:50:30

Release
Far and Away was released on May 22, 1992 in 1,583 theaters, 163 of which were in 70mm.

Home media
The film was originally released on VHS and laserdisc with it then released in the United States on DVD in May 1998 by Universal Pictures Home Entertainment with subtitles in English, Spanish and French. It was first released as a Blu-ray disc and HD download package on March 4, 2014 with one extra feature, a theatrical trailer.

Reception

Box office
The film, which cost $60 million to make, earned $13 million in its first weekend at the box office and stumbled at the box office making only $58 million in the United States and Canada. It was the third highest-grossing film in Ireland with a gross of £0.8 million. It grossed $79 million internationally for a worldwide total of $137 million.

Critical response
On Rotten Tomatoes the film has an approval rating of 50% based on reviews from 36 critics. The site's critics' consensus reads: "Handsome and simplistic, Far and Away has the beauty of an American epic without the breadth." 
On Metacritic it has a weighted average score of 49 out of 100 based on reviews from 19 critics, indicating "mixed or average reviews". 
Audiences surveyed by CinemaScore gave the film a grade "A" on scale of A to F.

Roger Ebert praised the film's cinematography while criticizing its script: 
Todd McCarthy of Variety called it "handsomely mounted and amiably performed but leisurely and without much dramatic urgency."

Hal Hinson of The Washington Post wrote: "Far and Away... is the director's attempt to step into the cinematic shoes of directors John Ford and David Lean. And, certainly, he's stepped into something with this sprawling, old-fashioned melodrama."

Writer Tony Parsons called it "a stinker of a picture...which was far and away the worst film I have ever seen."

The film was nominated for a Golden Raspberry Award for Worst Original Song for the song "Book of Days".

Telecast
For its airing on ABC in March 1995, the network reinstated 35 minutes of deleted scenes to fill two two-hour blocks over two nights.

References

External links
 
 
 Far and Away at TomCruise.com
 
 
 

1992 films
1992 romantic drama films
American adventure drama films
American romantic drama films
American boxing films
Films directed by Ron Howard
Films produced by Brian Grazer
Films scored by John Williams
Films set in Ireland
Films set in Boston
Films set in Oklahoma
Films set in 1892
Films set in 1893
Films shot in the Republic of Ireland
Films shot in Montana
Universal Pictures films
Imagine Entertainment films
American Western (genre) films
1992 Western (genre) films
1990s English-language films
1990s American films
Films set in the Ozarks